FightBox  is an international English language TV channel owned by Mediabox Broadcasting International, a division of SPI International. The network broadcasts programming related to combat sports, including mixed martial arts, boxing, kickboxing, and professional wrestling.

History
The channel was started June 1, 2012.

Programming

Bare Knuckle
Valor BK - American promotion.

Boxing
Dream Boxing
LNK Boxing - Baltic promotion.

Kickboxing
Colosseum Tournament - Romanian promotion.
Enfusion - Dutch promotion.
GFC - Romanian promotion.
KOK - Baltic promotion.
Kunlun Fight - Chinese promotion.
Makowski Fighting Championship - Polish promotion.
Mix Fight Championship - German promotion.
Mix Fight Gala - German promotion.
OSS Fighters - Romanian promotion.
Prometheus Fighting Promotion - Romanian promotion.
Superfight Serie Hungary - Hungarian promotion.
TatNeft Cup - Russian promotion.

MMA
Cage Fury - American promotion.
Bushido MMA - Baltic promotion.
RXF - Romanian promotion.
Thunderstrike Fight League - Polish promotion.

Professional wrestling
NEW - German promotion.

References

External links
 

English-language television stations
SPI International
Television channels in the Netherlands